Bernt is a Scandinavian variant of the German masculine given name Berend, which is the Low German form of Bernard (Bernhard). The name Bernhard means "strong bear" (from Old German bero, "bear", and harti, "strong"). Its use in Sweden was first documented in 1395.

Notable people with the name include:
 Bernt Albert (born 1944), Norwegian politician for the Conservative Party
 Bernt Balchen, D.F.C. (1899–1973), Norwegian, and later Norwegian-American, polar and aviation pioneer
 Bernt Bjørnsgaard (born 1973), Norwegian orienteering competitor and World champion
 Bernt Bull (born 1946), Norwegian politician for the Labour Party
 Bernt Carlsson (1938–1988), Assistant-Secretary-General of the United Nations and United Nations Commissioner for Namibia
 Bernt Johan Collet (born 1941), son of Chamberlain and Master of the Royal Hunt, Harald Collet and landscape architect Else Collett
 Bernt Evens (born 1978), Belgian professional footballer
 Bernt Evensen (1905–1979), Norwegian speed skater and racing cyclist
 Bernt Frilén, Swedish orienteering competitor, winner of the 1974 Individual World Orienteering Championships
 Bernt Haas (born 1978), Swiss football (soccer) defender
 Bernt Hagtvet (born 1946), Norwegian political scientist
 Bernt B. Haugan (born 1862), American Lutheran minister, politician, and temperance leader
 Bernt Michael Holmboe (1795–1850), Norwegian mathematician
 Bernt Holtsmark (1859–1941), Norwegian farmer and politician for the Conservative Party and the Liberal Left Party
 Bernt Hulsker (born 1977), Norwegian footballer playing
 Bernt Ingvaldsen (1902–1985), Norwegian politician for the Conservative Party
 Bernt Johansson (born 1953), retired road bicycle racer from Sweden, professional rider from 1977 to 1981
 Bernt Julius Muus (1832–1900), Norwegian-American Lutheran minister and church leader
 Bernt Krebs, German scientist
 Bernt Sverdrup Maschmann (1805–1869), Norwegian priest and politician
 Hans Bernt Myhre (born 1817), Norwegian politician
 Bernt Notke (born 1435), German painter and sculptor
 Bernt Oftestad (born 1942), professor in Western Cultural History at MF Norwegian School of Theology
 Bernt Øksendal (born 1945), Norwegian mathematician
 Bernt Olufsen (born 1954), the Editor-in-Chief of Verdens Gang (VG), the largest daily of Norway
 Bernt Østerkløft (1906–1996), Norwegian Nordic combined skier
 Bernt Östh (born 1936), Swedish Air Force major general
 Bernt Persson (born 1946), Swedish former international speedway rider
 Bernt Petersen (born 1937), Danish furniture designer often known simply as Bernt
 Jordan Bernt Peterson (born 1962), Canadian clinical psychologist and professor of psychology at the University of Toronto
 Bernt Rosengren (born 1937), Swedish jazz tenor saxophonist
 Bernt Ström (1940–2009), Swedish actor
 Bernt Tunold (1877–1946), Norwegian painter
 Bernt Wahl, mathematician, entrepreneur and author
 Bernt Wilhelm Westermann (1781–1868), wealthy Danish businessman who collected insects

See also
 D'ække bare, bare Bernt, Norwegian sitcom that aired on TV3 from 1996 to 1997
 Eric Bernt, American screenwriter
 Jan Fridthjof Bernt (born 1943), Norwegian jurist, Professor of Law and former rector (1996–1998) at the University of Bergen
 Bernd

References